The Ministry of Education of the Russian Federation is a ministry of the Government of Russia responsible for education.

The Ministry of Education oversees schooling and school accreditation, the establishment, maintenance, and closures of state schools, and controls the curriculums therein. It provides the procedural guidelines for interpersonal communications between schools, parents, legal guardians, and students, particularly in instances of unexpected or extenuating circumstances, such as the school closures or misconduct of school employees. It also governs institutions of professional and vocational education. It is headquartered at Tverskaya Street 11 in Tverskoy District, Central Administrative Okrug, Moscow.

The Ministry of Education was established on 17 May 2018 after the Ministry of Education and Science was split into two parts, with the departments for universities and scientific institutions forming the Ministry of Science and Higher Education. Its first minister was Olga Vasilieva, the minister of the previous ministry. The name of the Ministry of Education is sometimes translated into English as the "Ministry of Enlightenment" or "Ministry of General Education."

Sergey Kravtsov has served as the Minister of Education since 21 January 2020.

Ministers of Education
Olga Vasilieva (18 May 2018 — 21 January 2020)
Sergey Kravtsov (21 January 2020 — present)

References

External links

 Parent Ministry site: Ministry of Education and Science 

Study in Russia
Russian Education Ministry Information on Accreditation

Education in Russia
Education
Russia
Russia, Education